The 2011–12 Coventry Blaze season is the 9th season for the Coventry Blaze in the British Elite Ice Hockey League (EIHL).

Player roster and transfers 2011–12

Player roster
The Coventry Blaze roster for the 2011–12 season.

Two-way players
Players on a two-way contract with Coventry Blaze for the 2011–12 season.

Player transfers
Players leaving and joining the club for the 2011–12 season.

*signed on a one-month trial on 30 October

**signed temporarily for injury cover on 29 November

Fixtures & results 2011–12

Elite Ice Hockey League

Coventry Blaze completed the regular season in 5th place overall to qualify for the playoffs.

 Green background indicates win (2 points)
 Yellow background indicates overtime/shootout loss (1 point)
 Red background indicates regulation loss (0 points)

Playoffs

Coventry Blaze failed to reach the Playoff Finals weekend in Nottingham after losing to Cardiff Devils in the quarter finals 4-7 on aggregate.

 White background indicates tied game.
 Red background indicates loss.

Challenge Cup

Coventry Blaze failed to reach the knockout stages of the Challenge Cup after finishing 4th in their qualifying group.

 Green background indicates win (2 points)
 Red background indicates loss (0 points)
 White background indicates tied game (1 point)

Pre-season & challenge games
 Green background indicates win
 Red background indicates loss
 White background indicates tied game

Team statistics 2011–12

Player statistics
Player statistics for season 2011–12 (includes Challenge Cup & playoff games).

Team statistics
Team statistics for season 2011–12 (includes Challenge Cup & playoff games).

All stats are provided by 'R & J Stats', official statisticians to the Rapid Solicitors Elite Ice Hockey League.

Honours & awards
Below is a list of the major titles and honours awarded to Coventry Blaze in 2011-12.

Elite Ice Hockey League First team All-Stars
 2011-12 Shea Guthrie
Elite Ice Hockey League Second team All-Stars
 2011-12 Dustin Wood

References

Cov
Coventry Blaze seasons